The ASC 1846 Göttingen is a German basketball club based in Göttingen. ASC and its predecessor societies SSV Hellas Göttingen and SSC Göttingen played 16 times in the Federal basketball league (1966–67, 1970–71, 1973–75 and 1976–88). The club became three times German champion and twice in a row German Cup winner.

The men's team of ASC Göttingen is currently playing in 1 Regionalliga Nord. Venue is the gym of the Georg-Christoph-Lichtenberg Comprehensive School; Main training venue is the sports hall of the Mountain Grove High School, where most of the other league matches will be played.

Titles and achievements 
German League
 Winners (3): 1979–80, 1982–83, 1983–84
German Cup
 Winners (2): 1983–84, 1984–85

Games against NBA teams

External links 
  

Basketball teams in Germany
Göttingen